Slobodan Kuzmanovski (born 11 June 1962) is a Serbian handball coach and former player who competed for Yugoslavia in the 1984 Summer Olympics and in the 1988 Summer Olympics.

Club career
Born in Šabac, Kuzmanovski started out at his hometown club Metaloplastika. He helped them win seven consecutive Yugoslav Championships (1981–82, 1982–83, 1983–84, 1984–85, 1985–86, 1986–87, and 1987–88), four Yugoslav Cups (1979–80, 1982–83, 1983–84, and 1985–86), and two successive European Cups (1984–85 and 1985–86). Later on, Kuzmanovski played abroad in Spain, Switzerland, France, and Italy.

International career
At international level, Kuzmanovski won two Olympic medals for Yugoslavia, one gold (1984) and one bronze (1988). He was also a member of the team that placed fourth in the 1990 World Championship.

Coaching career
In 2013, Kuzmanovski briefly served as head coach of Slovak team Štart Nové Zámky. He previously coached Gaeta and Junior Fasano in Italy.

Honours
Metaloplastika
 Yugoslav Handball Championship: 1981–82, 1982–83, 1983–84, 1984–85, 1985–86, 1986–87, 1987–88
 Yugoslav Handball Cup: 1979–80, 1982–83, 1983–84, 1985–86
 European Cup: 1984–85, 1985–86
OM Vitrolles
 Championnat de France: 1993–94, 1995–96
 Coupe de France: 1992–93, 1994–95
 Cup Winners' Cup: 1992–93

References

External links
 Olympic record
 

1962 births
Living people
Sportspeople from Šabac
Serbian male handball players
Yugoslav male handball players
Olympic handball players of Yugoslavia
Olympic gold medalists for Yugoslavia
Olympic bronze medalists for Yugoslavia
Handball players at the 1984 Summer Olympics
Handball players at the 1988 Summer Olympics
Olympic medalists in handball
Medalists at the 1984 Summer Olympics
Medalists at the 1988 Summer Olympics
RK Metaloplastika players
CB Ademar León players
Liga ASOBAL players
Expatriate handball players
Yugoslav expatriate sportspeople in Spain
Yugoslav expatriate sportspeople in Switzerland
Yugoslav expatriate sportspeople in France
Serbian handball coaches
Serbian expatriate sportspeople in Italy
Serbian expatriate sportspeople in Slovakia